Telšiai District Municipality (Samogitian: Telšiū rajuona savivaldībė) is one of 60 municipalities in Lithuania, containing the city of Telšiai.

References

 
Municipalities of Telšiai County
Municipalities of Lithuania